Al-Ashmour is a sub-district located in Amran District, 'Amran Governorate, Yemen. Al-Ashmour had a population of 11706 according to the 2004 census.

References 

Sub-districts in Amran District